The Monk is a 1969 American made-for-television crime thriller film starring George Maharis, Janet Leigh, Jack Albertson and Carl Betz. Originally filmed as a television pilot, it premiered as the ABC Movie of the Week on October 21, 1969. It was directed by George McCowan in his film debut in a project developed by Blake Edwards that had been offered to George Mahrais three years previously.

Plot
Underworld attorney Leo Barnes hires Gus Monk to safeguard a valuable envelope containing information on a mobster. Monk refuses — until he meets Mrs. Barnes and jumps on a merry-go-round of viciousness and murder.

Main cast

Notes
 TV Guide (October 18–24, 1969)

References

External links
The Monk at the Internet Movie Database

1969 television films
1969 films
1960s crime thriller films
ABC Movie of the Week
American crime thriller films
Films set in San Francisco
Films shot in San Francisco
Films directed by George McCowan
1960s American films